GCG may refer to:

Biochemistry 
 GCG, a codon for the amino acid alanine
 Gallocatechin gallate, a flavonol
 Proglucagon, a protein
GCG (General Computer Group) was collection of programs for the analysis of gene and protein sequences, now defunct

Medical
 Ghost cell glaucoma

Other
 Gallantry Cross, Gold of the Republic of Venda
 Geological Curators' Group, a UK charity promoting geology
 Global Church of God, a Sabbatarian church based in England
 Government College Gujranwala, in Pakistan
 The Grilled Cheese Grill, an American restaurant chain
 Guardian Capital Group, a Canadian financial services company
 Gwaun-Cae-Gurwen, a village in Neath Port Talbot, Wales
 Knight Grand Cross of the Royal Guelphic Order, a Hanoverian order of chivalry